, provisional designation  and also known as o3l79, is a trans-Neptunian object from the classical Kuiper belt in the outermost region of the Solar System. It was discovered on 5 August 2013, by astronomer with the Outer Solar System Origins Survey at the Mauna Kea Observatories, Hawaii, in the United States.

Orbit and classification 

It orbits the Sun at a distance of 38.6–53.8 AU once every 314 years and 1 month (114,732 days; semi-major axis of 46.21 AU). Its orbit has an eccentricity of 0.16 and an inclination of 8° with respect to the ecliptic. The body's observation arc begins with its official discovery observation at Mauna Kea Observatories in August 2013.
 
As a cubewano, also known as classical Kuiper belt object,  is located in between the resonant plutino and twotino populations and has a low-eccentricity orbit. With an inclination above 8°, it belongs to the "stirred" hot population rather than to the cold population with lower inclinations.

Numbering and naming 

This minor planet was numbered by the Minor Planet Center on 4 November 2017 and received the number  in the minor planet catalog. As of 2018, it has not been named.

Physical characteristics 

According to the American astronomer Michael Brown,  measures 255 kilometers in diameter based on an assumed albedo of 0.08. On his website, Brown lists this object as a "possible" dwarf planet (200–400 km), which is the category with the lowest certainty in his 5-class taxonomic system. Similarly, Johnston's archive estimates a diameter 267 kilometers using an albedo of 0.09.

Spectroscopic measurements by the OSSOS team at the Gemini Observatory and with the Subaru Telescope gave a g–r and r–z color index of 0.61 and 0.47, respectively. As of 2018, no rotational lightcurve has been obtained from photometric observations. The body's rotation period, pole and shape remain unknown.

References

External links 
 MPEC 2017-L32 : 2013 SA100, Minor Planet Electronic Circular, 4 June 2017
 List of Transneptunian Objects, Minor Planet Center
 Discovery Circumstances: Numbered Minor Planets (505001)-(510000) – Minor Planet Center
 
 

505448
505448
505448
20130805